Bolko III may refer to:

 Bolko III of Strzelce (1337–1382)
 Bolko III of Münsterberg (1348–1410)